Word problem may refer to:

 Word problem (mathematics education), a type of textbook exercise or exam question to have students apply abstract mathematical concepts to real-world situations
 Word problem (mathematics), a decision problem for algebraic identities in mathematics and computer science
 Word problem for groups, the problem of recognizing the identity element in a finitely presented group 
 Word problem (computability), a decision problem concerning formal languages

See also
Word-finding problem; problem using words; language problem: aphasia
Word game
Wordle